is a private university in Hirosaki, Aomori Prefecture, Japan, established in 2002. The school operates as both a four-year and as a two-year junior college, specializing in nursing and medical social welfare.

External links
 Official website 

Nursing schools in Japan
Educational institutions established in 2002
Private universities and colleges in Japan
Universities and colleges in Aomori Prefecture
2002 establishments in Japan
Japanese junior colleges